Carlos Alberto Massad Abud (29 August 1932) was a Chilean politician and economist who served as minister and was two-times president of the Central Bank of Chile.

In 1982, he was involved in the economic scandal of the Bank of Talca alongside Sebastián Piñera.

References

External links
 Profile at the University of Chile Faculty of Economy

1932 births
Chilean people
20th-century Chilean politicians
21st-century Chilean politicians
Christian Democratic Party (Chile) politicians
University of Chile alumni
University of Chicago alumni
Living people